Miguel Alemán Municipality is a municipality located in Tamaulipas, Mexico.

References

Municipalities of Tamaulipas